Polyarnye Zori (lit. ) is a town in Murmansk Oblast, Russia, located on the Niva River, Lake Imandra, and Lake Pinozero,  south of Murmansk. The nearest settlements to Polyarnye Zory are: Zasheek (3km), Pinozero (4 km), Nivskiy (8km) and Afrikanda-1,2 (16 and 13 km). Population : 14,196 (2020 Сensus),

History
Polyarnye Zori was founded in 1968 as a settlement for workers of the electric power industry due to the construction of the Kola Nuclear Power Plant. Initially a work settlement subordinated to the town of Apatity, it was elevated in status to that of a town under oblast jurisdiction by the Presidium of the Supreme Soviet of the Russian SFSR Decree of April 22, 1991. A part of the territory in jurisdiction of Apatity was also transferred to Polyarnye Zori by the Decision of the Presidium of the Murmansk Oblast Soviet of People's Deputies of May 16, 1991.

Administrative and municipal status
Within the framework of administrative divisions, it is, together with two rural localities, incorporated as Polyarnye Zori Town with Jurisdictional Territory—an administrative unit with the status equal to that of the districts. As a municipal division, Polyarnye Zori Town with Jurisdictional Territory is incorporated as Polyarnye Zori Urban Okrug.

Mayors of Polyarnye Zori
Lyudmila Chistova (1994-1998)
Valery Mironov (1998-2001)
Vladimir Goncharenko (2001-2005)
Nikolay Goldobin (2005-2013)
Maxim Pukhov (since 2013)

Other notable residents 

Marina Sergina (born 1986 in Polyarnye Zori), ice hockey player 
Ivan Yershov (born 1979 in Polyarnye Zori), footballer

References

Notes

Sources

Cities and towns in Murmansk Oblast
Cities and towns built in the Soviet Union
Populated places established in 1968
 
Former urban-type settlements of Murmansk Oblast